CoRoT-7 (TYC 4799-1733-1) is a binary star system. The primary, CoRoT-7A is a G-type main sequence star, slightly smaller, cooler, and younger than the Sun. It has an apparent magnitude of 11.67, fainter than Proxima Centauri (mag. 11.05), the nearest star to the Sun. This star is approximately 520 light-years away from the Solar System in the constellation Monoceros (the Unicorn).

The comoving companion CoRoT-7B was discovered in 2021. It is a red dwarf star.

Location and properties
The star is located in the LRa01 field of view of the  CoRoT spacecraft. It is about 500 light years from Earth.  According to the project website, this field is in the Monoceros constellation. Published data lists the stellar properties as being a G9V yellow dwarf with a temperature of 5250 K, a radius of about 82% of the Sun and a mass of about 91% of the Sun. But other sources have listed it as a (K0V) orange dwarf. The metallicity is 0.12 ± 0.06. The star is estimated to be about 150 parsecs away and with an age in the range 1.2 – 2.3 billion years, is younger than our own star which has an age of 4.6 billion years. The rotation period of the star, inferred by the lightcurve obtained by CoRoT, is around 23 days.

Planetary system
The primary star is orbited by the super-Earth exoplanets CoRoT-7b and CoRoT-7c, both discovered in 2009. A third planet CoRoT-7d, initially proposed in a 2010 study, was confirmed in 2022. The discovery of the inner planet was made using the transit method by the CoRoT program. CoRoT-7b is notable for its relatively small size, compared to other exoplanets known at the time.

Because of their closeness to their star, these exoplanets cannot be seen in a telescope; only their gravitational effect can be detected by the Doppler effect on the star's electromagnetic spectrum (radial velocity method), as well as transits of planet b. This star was reported to have stellar activity, making the confirmation process for CoRoT-7b more difficult. In fact, mass estimates are affected by large uncertainty due to stellar activity that perturbs the radial velocity measurements needed to "weigh" the planets.

CoRoT-7d was first proposed by A. P. Hatzes et al in 2010 by the radial velocity method. The existence of CoRoT-7d was disputed by a 2014 study, which concluded that the radial velocity signal was more likely to be an artifact of the stellar rotation. However, a 2022 study provided strong evidence for the existence of this planet, and it is now listed as a confirmed planet in the NASA Exoplanet Archive. CoRoT-7d's mass is 17.1 times that of Earth, but its volume and diameter are unknown. One year on CoRoT-7d would be equivalent to 8.966 days on Earth.

References

External links
 

G-type main-sequence stars
M-type main-sequence stars
Binary stars
Planetary transit variables
Planetary systems with three confirmed planets
Monoceros (constellation)